The 1998 New York Yankees season was the 96th season for the Yankees. Widely regarded as one of the greatest teams in baseball history, the team finished with a franchise record regular-season standing of 114–48. These Yankees set an American League record for wins in a season, a record that would stand until 2001, when the Seattle Mariners won 116 games in the regular season against 46 losses (the Yankees still hold the record for most regular season wins by a team that won the World Series). It also saw Yankees pitcher David Wells pitch the 15th perfect game in baseball history. New York was managed by Joe Torre. The Yankees played at Yankee Stadium, in which they celebrated the stadium's 75th Anniversary.

In the postseason, they swept the Texas Rangers in the American League Division Series, won the American League pennant by beating the Cleveland Indians four games to two in the American League Championship Series, and swept the San Diego Padres to capture their 24th World Series. Including the playoffs, the 1998 Yankees won a total of 125 games against 50 losses, an MLB record.

Offseason transactions
 November 11, 1997: Charlie Hayes was traded by the New York Yankees with cash to the San Francisco Giants for Chris Singleton and Alberto Castillo (minors).
 November 12, 1997: Luis Sojo was signed as a free agent with the New York Yankees.
 November 18, 1997: Scott Brosius was sent by the Oakland Athletics to the New York Yankees to complete an earlier deal made on November 7, 1997. The Oakland Athletics sent a player to be named later to the New York Yankees for Kenny Rogers and cash.
 November 25, 1997: Dale Sveum was signed as a free agent with the New York Yankees.
 December 10, 1997: Chili Davis signed as a free agent with the New York Yankees.
 January 8, 1998: Darryl Strawberry re-signed as a free agent with the New York Yankees.
 January 15, 1998: Tim Raines re-signed as a free agent with the New York Yankees.
 January 26, 1998: Doug Linton was signed as a free agent with the New York Yankees.
 February 6, 1998: Chuck Knoblauch was traded by the Minnesota Twins to the New York Yankees for Brian Buchanan, Cristian Guzmán, Eric Milton, Danny Mota, and cash.
 March 14, 1998: Doug Linton was released by the New York Yankees.
 June 2, 1998: Mark Prior was drafted by the New York Yankees in the 1st round (43rd pick) of the 1998 amateur draft, but did not sign.
 June 2, 1998: Drew Henson was drafted by the New York Yankees in the 3rd round of the 1998 amateur draft. Player signed July 24, 1998.
 June 28, 1998: Ken Huckaby was signed as a free agent with the New York Yankees.
 August 3, 1998: Dale Sveum was released by the New York Yankees.
 September 29, 1998: Alfonso Soriano was purchased by the New York Yankees from the Hiroshima Toyo Carp (Japan Central).

Season standings

Record vs. opponents

Detailed records

Roster

Game log

|- style="background-color:#fbb"
| 1 || April 1 || @ Angels || 1–4 || Finley (1–0) || Pettitte (0–1) || Percival (1) || 43,311 || 0–1
|- style="background-color:#fbb"
| 2 || April 2 || @ Angels || 2–10 || Hill (1–0) || Wells (0–1) || — || 29,899 || 0–2
|- style="background-color:#fbb"
| 3 || April 4 || @ Athletics || 3–7 || Haynes || Cone (0–1) || — || 17,118 || 0–3
|- style="background-color:#cfc"
| 4 || April 5 || @ Athletics || 9–7 10 || Nelson (1–0) || Mohler || — || 18,109 || 1–3
|- style="background-color:#fbb"
| 5 || April 6 || @ Mariners || 0–8 || Moyer || Pettitte (0–2) || — || 27,445 || 1–4
|- style="background-color:#cfc"
| 6 || April 7 || @ Mariners || 13–7 || Wells (1–1) || Bullinger || — || 28,424 || 2–4
|- style="background-color:#cfc"
| 7 || April 8 || @ Mariners || 4–3 || Lloyd (1–0) || Ayala || Stanton (1) || 33,922 || 3–4
|- style="background-color:#cfc"
| 8 || April 10 || Athletics || 17–13 || Buddie (1–0) || Dougherty || — || 56,717 || 4–4
|- style="background-color:#cfc"
| 9 || April 11 || Athletics || 3–1 || Pettitte (1–2) || Candiotti || Stanton (2) || 33,238 || 5–4
|- style="background-color:#cfc"
| 10 || April 12 || Athletics || 7–5 || Buddie (2–0) || Mathews || Stanton (3) || 27,057 || 6–4
|- align="center" bgcolor="bbbbbb"
| -- || April 13 || Angels || colspan=5| Postponed (stadium structural problems); rescheduled for August 24 || ||
|- align="center" bgcolor="bbbbbb"
| -- || April 14 || Angels || colspan=5| Postponed (stadium structural problems); rescheduled for August 26 || ||
|- style="background-color:#cfc"
| 11 || April 15 || Angels (at Shea Stadium in Flushing, NY) || 6–3 || Wells (2–1) || Hill (2–1) || Nelson (1) || 40,743 || 7–4
|- style="background-color:#cfc"
| 12 || April 17 || @ Tigers || 11–2 || Pettitte (2–2) || Thompson || — || 12,348 || 8–4
|- style="background-color:#cfc"
| 13 || April 18 || @ Tigers || 8–3 || Cone (1–1) || Keagle || — || 13,803 || 9–4
|- style="background-color:#fbb"
| 14 || April 19 || @ Tigers || 1–2 || Moehler || Holmes (0–1) || Jones || 12,568 || 9–5
|- style="background-color:#cfc"
| 15 || April 20 || @ Blue Jays || 3–2 11 || Banks (1–0) || Risley || Stanton (4) || 26,385 || 10–5
|- style="background-color:#cfc"
| 16 || April 21 || @ Blue Jays || 5–3 10 || Stanton (1–0) || Plesac || — || 27,192 || 11–5
|- style="background-color:#cfc"
| 17 || April 22 || @ Blue Jays || 9–1 || Pettitte (3–2) || Clemens || — || 29,164 || 12–5
|- style="background-color:#cfc"
| 18 || April 24 || Tigers || 8–4 || Cone (2–1) || Keagle || — || 26,173 || 13–5
|- style="background-color:#cfc"
| 19 || April 25 || Tigers || 5–4 || Wells (3–1) || Runyan || Rivera (1) || 33,196 || 14–5
|- style="background-color:#cfc"
| 20 || April 27 || Blue Jays || 1–0 || Pettitte (4–2) || Clemens || Rivera (2) || 17,863 || 15–5
|- style="background-color:#fbb"
| 21 || April 28 || Blue Jays || 2–5 || Williams || Mendoza (0–1) || Myers || 18,727 || 15–6
|- style="background-color:#cfc"
| 22 || April 29 || Mariners || 8–5 || Cone (3–1) || Fassero || Rivera (3) || 27,949 || 16–6
|- style="background-color:#cfc"
| 23 || April 30 || Mariners || 9–8 10 || Rivera (1–0) || Ayala || — || 28,517 || 17–6

|-

|- style="background-color:#cfc"
| 24 || May 1 || @ Royals || 2–1 || Irabu (1–0) || Rapp || Rivera (4) || 19,002 || 18–6
|- style="background-color:#cfc"
| 25 || May 2 || @ Royals || 12–6 || Pettitte (5–2) || Haney || — || 22,743 || 19–6
|- style="background-color:#cfc"
| 26 || May 3 || @ Royals || 10–1 || Mendoza (1–1) || Belcher || — || 22,609 || 20–6
|- style="background-color:#cfc"
| 27 || May 5 || @ Rangers || 7–2 || Cone (4–1) || Burkett || — || 31,693 || 21–6
|- style="background-color:#cfc"
| 28 || May 6 || @ Rangers || 15–13 || Stanton (2–0) || Patterson || Rivera (5) || 33,274 || 22–6
|- style="background-color:#cfc"
| 29 || May 8 || @ Twins || 5–1 || Irabu (2–0) || Radke || Nelson (2) || 22,612 || 23–6
|- style="background-color:#fbb"
| 30 || May 9 || @ Twins || 1–8 || Morgan || Pettitte (5–3) || — || 20,471 || 23–7
|- style="background-color:#cfc"
| 31 || May 10 || @ Twins || 7–0 || Mendoza (2–1) || Milton || — || 12,444 || 24–7
|- style="background-color:#cfc"
| 32 || May 12 || Royals || 3–2 || Wells (4–1) || Rusch || Rivera (6) || 16,606 || 25–7
|- style="background-color:#cfc"
| 33 || May 13 || Rangers || 8–6 || Cone (5–1) || Helling || Rivera (7) || 23,142 || 26–7
|- style="background-color:#fbb"
| 34 || May 14 || Rangers || 5–7 13 || Patterson || Banks (1–1) || Wetteland || 20,694 || 26–8
|- style="background-color:#fbb"
| 35 || May 15 || Twins || 6–7 || Milton || Pettitte (5–4) || Aguilera || 31,272 || 26–9
|- style="background-color:#cfc"
| 36 || May 16 || Twins || 5–2 || Mendoza (3–1) || Tewksbury || Rivera (8) || 35,137 || 27–9
|- style="background-color:#cfc"
| 37 || May 17 || Twins || 4–0 || Wells (5–1) || Hawkins || — || 49,820 || 28–9
|- style="background-color:#cfc"
| 38 || May 19 || Orioles || 9–5 || Stanton (3–0) || Charlton || — || 31,311 || 29–9
|- style="background-color:#cfc"
| 39 || May 20 || Orioles || 9–6 || Irabu (3–0) || Key || — || 32,449 || 30–9
|- style="background-color:#cfc"
| 40 || May 21 || Orioles || 3–1 || Pettitte (6–4) || Erickson || Rivera (9) || 34,588 || 31–9
|- style="background-color:#fbb"
| 41 || May 22 || @ Red Sox || 4–5 || Wakefield || Nelson (1–1) || Gordon || 33,605 || 31–10
|- style="background-color:#cfc"
| 42 || May 23 || @ Red Sox || 12–3 || Wells (6–1) || Lowe || — || 33,120 || 32–10
|- style="background-color:#cfc"
| 43 || May 24 || @ Red Sox || 14–4 || Cone (6–1) || Saberhagen || — || 33,042 || 33–10
|- style="background-color:#cfc"
| 44 || May 25 || @ White Sox || 12–0 || Irabu (4–0) || Navarro || — || 19,812 || 34–10
|- style="background-color:#cfc"
| 45 || May 26 || @ White Sox || 7–5 || Nelson (2–1) || Foulke || Rivera (10) || 14,596 || 35–10
|- style="background-color:#fbb"
| 46 || May 27 || @ White Sox || 9–12 || Simas || Nelson (2–2) || Karchner || 15,232 || 35–11
|- style="background-color:#cfc"
| 47 || May 28 || Red Sox || 8–3 || Wells (7–1) || Wakefield || Stanton (5) || 42,182 || 36–11
|- style="background-color:#cfc"
| 48 || May 29 || Red Sox || 6–2 || Cone (7–1) || Lowe || — || 47,160 || 37–11
|- style="background-color:#fbb"
| 49 || May 30 || Red Sox || 2–3 || Saberhagen || Irabu (4–1) || Gordon || 55,191 || 37–12
|- style="background-color:#fbb"
| 50 || May 31 || Red Sox || 7–13 || Martinez || Pettitte (6–5) || — || 55,711 || 37–13

|-

|- style="background-color:#cfc"
| 51 || June 1 || White Sox || 5–4 10 || Nelson (3–2) || Karchner || — || 19,131 || 38–13
|- style="background-color:#cfc"
| 52 || June 2 || White Sox || 6–3 || Wells (8–1) || Sirotka || Rivera (11) || 22,599 || 39–13
|- style="background-color:#cfc"
| 53 || June 3 || Devil Rays || 7–1 || Hernandez (1–0) || Saunders || — || 27,291 || 40–13
|- style="background-color:#cfc"
| 54 || June 4 || Devil Rays || 6–1 || Irabu (5–1) || Springer || — || 22,759 || 41–13
|- style="background-color:#cfc"
| 55 || June 5 || Marlins || 5–1 || Pettitte (7–5) || Fontenot || — || 28,085 || 42–13
|- style="background-color:#cfc"
| 56 || June 6 || Marlins || 4–2 || Mendoza (4–1) || Sanchez || Rivera (12) || 36,419 || 43–13
|- style="background-color:#cfc"
| 57 || June 7 || Marlins || 4–1 || Cone (8–1) || Dempster || — || 47,731 || 44–13
|- style="background-color:#cfc"
| 58 || June 9 || @ Expos || 11–1 || Hernandez (2–0) || Perez || — || 16,238 || 45–13
|- style="background-color:#cfc"
| 59 || June 10 || @ Expos || 6–2 || Irabu (6–1) || Hermanson || — || 14,335 || 46–13
|- style="background-color:#fbb"
| 60 || June 11 || @ Expos || 5–7 || Valdes || Nelson (3–3) || Urbina || 16,036 || 46–14
|- style="background-color:#cfc"
| 61 || June 14 || Indians || 4–2 || Cone (9–1) || Wright || Rivera (13) || 42,949 || 47–14
|- style="background-color:#fbb"
| 62 || June 15 || @ Orioles || 4–7 || Erickson || Wells (8–2) || Orosco || 48,022 || 47–15
|- style="background-color:#fbb"
| 63 || June 16 || @ Orioles || 0–2 || Ponson || Irabu (6–2) || Rhodes || 48,027 || 47–16
|- style="background-color:#cfc"
| 64 || June 17 || @ Orioles || 5–3 || Pettitte (8–5) || Mussina || Rivera (14) || 48,269 || 48–16
|- style="background-color:#cfc"
| 65 || June 18 || @ Indians || 5–2 || Nelson (4–3) || Assenmacher || Rivera (15) || 43,096 || 49–16
|- style="background-color:#fbb"
| 66 || June 19 || @ Indians || 4–7 || Wright || Cone (9–2) || Jackson || 43,180 || 49–17
|- style="background-color:#cfc"
| 67 || June 20 || @ Indians || 5–3 || Wells (9–2) || Burba || Rivera (16) || 43,259 || 50–17
|- style="background-color:#fbb"
| 68 || June 21 || @ Indians || 0–11 || Colon || Irabu (6–3) || — || 43,104 || 50–18
|- style="background-color:#cfc"
| 69 || June 22 || Braves || 6–4 || Nelson (5–3) || Martinez || Rivera (17) || 53,316 || 51–18
|- style="background-color:#fbb"
| 70 || June 23 || Braves || 2–7 || Glavine || Hernandez (2–1) || — || 54,775 || 51–19
|- style="background-color:#cfc"
| 71 || June 24 || @ Braves || 10–6 || Cone (10–2) || Millwood || Rivera (18) || 48,980 || 52–19
|- style="background-color:#cfc"
| 72 || June 25 || @ Braves || 6–0 || Wells (10–2) || Neagle || — || 49,052 || 53–19
|- style="background-color:#cfc"
| 73 || June 26 || @ Mets || 8–4 || Mendoza (5–1) || Leiter || Rivera (19) || 53,404 || 54–19
|- style="background-color:#cfc"
| 74 || June 27 || @ Mets || 7–2 || Pettitte (9–5) || Jones || — || 53,587 || 55–19
|- style="background-color:#fbb"
| 75 || June 28 || @ Mets || 1–2 || Cook || Mendoza (5–2) || — || 53,749 || 55–20
|- style="background-color:#cfc"
| 76 || June 30 || Phillies || 9–2 || Cone (11–2) || Loewer || — || 29,087 || 56–20

|-

|- style="background-color:#cfc"
| 77 || July 1 || Phillies || 5–2 || Wells (11–2) || Beech || Rivera (20) || 28,919 || 57–20
|- style="background-color:#cfc"
| 78 || July 2 || Phillies || 9–8 11 || Buddie (3–0) || Spradlin || — || 31,259 || 58–20
|- style="background-color:#cfc"
| 79 || July 3 || Orioles || 3–2 || Pettitte (10–5) || Orosco || — || 43,328 || 59–20
|- style="background-color:#cfc"
| 80 || July 4 || Orioles || 4–3 || Hernandez (3–1) || Drabek || Rivera (21) || 37,390 || 60–20
|- style="background-color:#cfc"
| 81 || July 5 || Orioles || 1–0 || Cone (12–2) || Erickson || Rivera (22) || 52,506 || 61–20
|- style="background-color:#cfc"
| 82 || July 9 || @ Devil Rays || 2–0 || Pettitte (11–5) || Rekar || Rivera (23) || 38,386 || 62–20
|- style="background-color:#cfc"
| 83 || July 10 || @ Devil Rays || 8–4 || Irabu (7–3) || Alvarez || Mendoza (1) || 40,363 || 63–20
|- style="background-color:#cfc"
| 84 || July 11 || @ Devil Rays || 2–0 || Cone (13–2) || Arrojo || Rivera (24) || 44,589 || 64–20
|- style="background-color:#cfc"
| 85 || July 12 || @ Devil Rays || 9–2 || Stanton (4–0) || Hernandez || — || 43,373 || 65–20
|- style="background-color:#fbb"
| 86 || July 13 || @ Indians || 1–4 || Wright || Hernandez (3–2) || Jackson || 43,177 || 65–21
|- style="background-color:#cfc"
| 87 || July 14 || @ Indians || 7–1 || Pettitte (12–5) || Burba || — || 43,164 || 66–21
|- style="background-color:#cfc"
| 88 || July 15 || @ Tigers || 11–0 || Irabu (8–3) || Greisinger || — || 19,868 || 67–21
|- style="background-color:#fbb"
| 89 || July 16 || @ Tigers || 1–3 || Moehler || Cone (13–3) || Jones || 21,336 || 67–22
|- style="background-color:#fbb"
| 90 || July 17 || @ Blue Jays || 6–9 || Clemens || Holmes (0–2) || Myers || 39,172 || 67–23
|- style="background-color:#cfc"
| 91 || July 18 || @ Blue Jays || 10–3 || Hernandez (4–2) || Guzman || — || 48,123 || 68–23
|- style="background-color:#fbb"
| 92 || July 19 || @ Blue Jays || 3–9 || Williams || Pettitte (12–6) || — || 42,176 || 68–24
|- style="background-color:#fbb"
| 93 || July 20 || Tigers || 3–4 17 || Sager || Holmes (0–3) || — || 0 || 68–25
|- style="background-color:#cfc"
| 94 || July 20 || Tigers || 4–3 || Irabu (9–3) || Florie || Rivera (25) || 36,285 || 69–25
|- style="background-color:#cfc"
| 95 || July 21 || Tigers || 5–1 || Cone (14–3) || Moehler || — || 35,980 || 70–25
|- style="background-color:#cfc"
| 96 || July 22 || Tigers || 13–2 || Hernandez (5–2) || Powell || Holmes (1) || 49,029 || 71–25
|- style="background-color:#cfc"
| 97 || July 24 || White Sox || 5–4 || Pettitte (13–6) || Ward || Rivera (26) || 44,264 || 72–25
|- style="background-color:#fbb"
| 98 || July 25 || White Sox || 2–6 || Sirotka || Irabu (9–4) || Simas || 55,638 || 72–26
|- style="background-color:#cfc"
| 99 || July 26 || White Sox || 6–3 || Wells (12–2) || Navarro || Rivera (27) || 51,865 || 73–26
|- style="background-color:#cfc"
| 100 || July 28 || @ Angels || 9–3 || Cone (15–3) || Dickson (9–8) || — || 36,241 || 74–26
|- style="background-color:#fbb"
| 101 || July 29 || @ Angels || 5–10 || Sparks (4–2) || Hernández (5–3) || — || 38,829 || 74–27
|- style="background-color:#cfc"
| 102 || July 30 || @ Angels || 3–0 (10) || Mendoza (6–2) || DeLucia (1–4) || Rivera (28) || 42,915 || 75–27
|- style="background-color:#cfc"
| 103 || July 31 || @ Mariners || 5–3 || Irabu (10–4) || Fassero || Rivera (29) || 43,837 || 76–27

|-

|- style="background-color:#cfc"
| 104 || August 1 || @ Mariners || 5–2 || Wells (13–2) || Moyer || — || 53,840 || 77–27
|- style="background-color:#fbb"
| 105 || August 2 || @ Mariners || 3–6 || Wells || Cone (15–4) || Timlin || 47,872 || 77–28
|- style="background-color:#cfc"
| 106 || August 3 || @ Athletics || 14–1 || Hernandez (6–3) || Oquist || — || 18,209 || 78–28
|- style="background-color:#cfc"
| 107 || August 4 || @ Athletics || 10–4 || Mendoza (7–2) || Witasick || Stanton (6) || 0 || 79–28
|- style="background-color:#cfc"
| 108 || August 4 || @ Athletics || 10–5 || Lloyd (2–0) || Taylor || — || 23,357 || 80–28
|- style="background-color:#fbb"
| 109 || August 5 || @ Athletics || 1–3 || Candiotti || Irabu (10–5) || — || 22,458 || 80–29
|- style="background-color:#cfc"
| 110 || August 7 || Royals || 8–2 || Cone (16–4) || Rapp || — || 14,425 || 81–29
|- style="background-color:#cfc"
| 111 || August 7 || Royals || 14–2 || Wells (15–2) || Haney || — || 37,988 || 82–29
|- style="background-color:#cfc"
| 112 || August 8 || Royals || 14–1 || Hernandez (7–3) || Rusch || — || 45,975 || 83–29
|- style="background-color:#cfc"
| 113 || August 9 || Royals || 5–4 || Mendoza (8–2) || Service || Rivera (30) || 55,911 || 84–29
|- style="background-color:#cfc"
| 114 || August 10 || Twins || 7–3 || Irabu (11–5) || Rodriguez || — || 29,600 || 85–29
|- style="background-color:#cfc"
| 115 || August 11 || Twins || 7–0 || Wells (16–2) || Milton || — || 37,413 || 86–29
|- style="background-color:#cfc"
| 116 || August 12 || Twins || 11–2 || Cone (17–4) || Hawkins || — || 47,841 || 87–29
|- style="background-color:#cfc"
| 117 || August 13 || Rangers || 2–0 || Hernandez (8–3) || Helling || Rivera (31) || 53,835 || 88–29
|- style="background-color:#cfc"
| 118 || August 14 || Rangers || 6–4 || Pettitte (14–6) || Sele || Rivera (32) || 46,547 || 89–29
|- style="background-color:#fbb"
| 119 || August 15 || Rangers || 5–16 || Stottlemyre || Irabu (11–6) || — || 53,117 || 89–30
|- style="background-color:#cfc"
| 120 || August 16 || Rangers || 6–5 || Rivera (2–0) || Hernandez || — || 50,304 || 90–30
|- style="background-color:#cfc"
| 121 || August 17 || @ Royals || 7–1 || Cone (18–4) || Rosado || — || 27,895 || 91–30
|- style="background-color:#cfc"
| 122 || August 18 || @ Royals || 3–2 13 || Borowski || Whisenant || — || 26,259 || 92–30
|- style="background-color:#fbb"
| 123 || August 19 || @ Twins || 3–5 || Serafini || Pettitte (14–7) || Aguilera || 17,923 || 92–31
|- style="background-color:#fbb"
| 124 || August 20 || @ Twins || 4–9 || Rodriguez || Buddie (3–1) || — || 18,548 || 92–32
|- style="background-color:#cfc"
| 125 || August 21 || @ Rangers || 5–0 || Wells (17–2) || Loaiza || — || 45,841 || 93–32
|- style="background-color:#cfc"
| 126 || August 22 || @ Rangers || 12–9 || Bradley (1–0) || Hernandez || Rivera (33) || 46,483 || 94–32
|- style="background-color:#fbb"
| 127 || August 23 || @ Rangers || 10–12 || Helling || Hernandez (8–4) || Wetteland || 37,284 || 94–33
|- style="background-color:#fbb"
| 128 || August 24 || Angels || 3–7 || McDowell (3–2) || Pettitte (14–8) || — || 19,297 || 94–34
|- style="background-color:#fbb"
| 129 || August 25 || Angels || 6–7 || Watson (6–7) || Stanton (4–1) || Percival (36) || 30,422 || 94–35
|- style="background-color:#fbb"
| 130 || August 26 || Angels || 4–6 || Juden (1–2) || Bradley (1–1) || Percival (37) || 20,077 || 94–36
|- style="background-color:#cfc"
| 131 || August 26 || Angels || 7–6 || Rivera (3–0) || Fetters (2–7) || — || 28,837 || 95–36
|- style="background-color:#cfc"
| 132 || August 27 || Angels || 6–5 (11) || Tessmer (1–0) || Fetters (2–8) || — || 29,213 || 96–36
|- style="background-color:#cfc"
| 133 || August 28 || Mariners || 10–3 || Hernandez (9–4) || Spoljaric || — || 49,789 || 97–36
|- style="background-color:#cfc"
| 134 || August 29 || Mariners || 11–6 || Pettitte (15–8) || Cloude || — || 55,146 || 98–36
|- style="background-color:#fbb"
| 135 || August 30 || Mariners || 3–13 || Swift || Irabu (11–7) || — || 55,341 || 98–37

|-

|- style="background-color:#cfc"
| 136 || September 1 || Athletics || 7–0 || Wells (18–2) || Candiotti || — || 29,632 || 99–37
|- style="background-color:#fbb"
| 137 || September 2 || Athletics || 0–2 || Heredia || Cone (18–5) || Taylor || 30,332 || 99–38
|- style="background-color:#cfc"
| 138 || September 4 || @ White Sox || 11–6 || Lloyd (3–0) || Bradford || — || 19,876 || 100–38
|- style="background-color:#fbb"
| 139 || September 5 || @ White Sox || 5–9 || Abbott || Pettitte (15–9) || — || 33,092 || 100–39
|- style="background-color:#fbb"
| 140 || September 6 || @ White Sox || 5–6 || Baldwin || Irabu (11–8) || Howry || 24,498 || 100–40
|- style="background-color:#fbb"
| 141 || September 7 || @ Red Sox || 3–4 || Swindell || Wells (18–3) || Gordon || 32,106 || 100–41
|- style="background-color:#cfc"
| 142 || September 8 || @ Red Sox || 3–2 || Cone (19–5) || Martinez || Rivera (34) || 33,409 || 101–41
|- style="background-color:#cfc"
| 143 || September 9 || @ Red Sox || 7–5 || Mendoza (9–2) || Wakefield || Rivera (35) || 32,942 || 102–41
|- style="background-color:#cfc"
| 144 || September 10 || Blue Jays || 8–5 || Pettitte (16–9) || Hentgen || Holmes (2) || 25,881 || 103–41
|- style="background-color:#fbb"
| 145 || September 11 || Blue Jays || 4–5 || Almanzar || Irabu (11–9) || Person || 35,856 || 103–42
|- style="background-color:#fbb"
| 146 || September 12 || Blue Jays || 3–5 || Carpenter || Wells (18–4) || Person || 48,752 || 103–43
|- style="background-color:#fbb"
| 147 || September 13 || Blue Jays || 3–5 || Escobar || Cone (19–6) || Person || 47,471 || 103–44
|- style="background-color:#cfc"
| 148 || September 14 || Red Sox || 3–0 || Hernandez (10–4) || Martinez || — || 42,735 || 104–44
|- style="background-color:#fbb"
| 149 || September 15 || Red Sox || 4–9 || Wakefield || Jerzembeck (0–1) || — || 43,218 || 104–45
|- style="background-color:#fbb"
| 150 || September 16 || @ Devil Rays || 0–7 || Saunders || Pettitte (16–10) || — || 38,862 || 104–46
|- style="background-color:#cfc"
| 151 || September 17 || @ Devil Rays || 4–0 || Irabu (12–9) || Santana || — || 38,820 || 105–46
|- style="background-color:#cfc"
| 152 || September 18 || @ Orioles || 15–5 || Wells (19–4) || Guzman || — || 48,113 || 106–46
|- style="background-color:#fbb"
| 153 || September 19 || @ Orioles || 3–5 || Ponson || Cone (19–7) || Mills || 48,044 || 106–47
|- style="background-color:#cfc"
| 154 || September 20 || @ Orioles || 5–4 || Hernandez (11–4) || Johns || Rivera (36) || 48,013 || 107–47
|- style="background-color:#fbb"
| 155 || September 21 || Indians || 1–4 || Nagy || Pettitte (16–11) || Shuey || 21,449 || 107–48
|- style="background-color:#cfc"
| 156 || September 22 || Indians || 10–4 || Mendoza (10–2) || Burba || — || 14,840 || 108–48
|- style="background-color:#cfc"
| 157 || September 22 || Indians || 5–1 || Irabu (13–9) || Ogea || — || 32,315 || 109–48
|- style="background-color:#cfc"
| 158 || September 23 || Indians || 8–4 || Bradley (2–1) || Jacome || — || 32,367 || 110–48
|- style="background-color:#cfc"
| 159 || September 24 || Devil Rays || 5–2 || Buddie (4–1) || Alvarez || Nelson (3) || 24,555 || 111–48
|- style="background-color:#cfc"
| 160 || September 25 || Devil Rays || 6–1 || Hernandez (12–4) || Eiland || — || 32,447 || 112–48
|- style="background-color:#cfc"
| 161 || September 26 || Devil Rays || 3–1 || Cone (20–7) || Wade || — || 41,150 || 113–48
|- style="background-color:#cfc"
| 162 || September 27 || Devil Rays || 8–3 || Bruske (1–0) || White || — || 49,608 || 114–48

Postseason Game log

|- style="background-color:#cfc"
| 1 || September 29 || Rangers || 2–0 || Wells (1–0) || Stottlemyre (0–1) || Rivera (1) || 57,362 || 1–0
|- style="background-color:#cfc"
| 2 || September 30 || Rangers || 3–1 || Pettitte (1–0) || Helling (0–1) || Rivera (2) || 57,360 || 2–0
|- style="background-color:#cfc"
| 3 || October 2 || @ Rangers || 4–0 || Cone (1–0) || Sele (0–1) || || 49,450 || 3–0

|- style="background-color:#cfc"
| 1 || October 6 || Indians || 7–2 || Wells (2–0) || Wright (0–2) || || 57,138 || 1–0
|- style="background-color:#fbb"
| 2 || October 7 || Indians || 1–4 || Burba (2–0) || Nelson (0–1) || Jackson (4) || 57,128 || 1–1
|- style="background-color:#fbb"
| 3 || October 9 || @ Indians || 1–6 || Colon (1–0) || Pettitte (1–1) || || 44,904 || 1–2
|- style="background-color:#cfc"
| 4 || October 10 || @ Indians || 4–0 || Hernandez (1–0) || Gooden (0–1) || || 44,981 || 2–2
|- style="background-color:#cfc"
| 5 || October 11 || @ Indians || 5–3 || Wells (3–0) || Ogea (0–1) || Rivera (3) || 44,966 || 3–2
|- style="background-color:#cfc"
| 6 || October 13 || Indians || 9–5 || Cone (2–0) || Nagy (1–1) || || 57,142 || 4–2

|- style="background-color:#cfc"
| 1 || October 17 || Padres || 9–6 || Wells (4–0) || Wall (0–1) || Rivera (4) || 56,712 || 1–0
|- style="background-color:#cfc"
| 2 || October 18 || Padres || 9–3 || Hernandez (2–0) || Ashby (0–1) || || 56,692 || 2–0
|- style="background-color:#cfc"
| 3 || October 20 || @ Padres || 5–4 || Mendoza (1–0) || Hoffman (1–1) || Rivera (5) || 64,667 || 3–0
|- style="background-color:#cfc"
| 4 || October 21 || @ Padres || 3–0 || Pettitte (2–1) || Brown (2–2) || Rivera (6) || 65,427 || 4–0

Player stats

Batting
Note: Pos = Position; G = Games played; AB = At bats; H = Hits; Avg. = Batting average; HR = Home runs; RBI = Runs batted in

Other batters
Note: G = Games played; AB = At bats; H = Hits; Avg. = Batting average; HR = Home runs; RBI = Runs batted in

Starting pitchers
Note: G = Games pitched; IP = Innings pitched; W = Wins; L = Losses; ERA = Earned run average; SO = Strikeouts

Relief pitchers
Note: G = Games pitched; IP = Innings pitched; W = Wins; L = Losses; SV = Saves; ERA = Earned run average; SO = Strikeouts

Other pitchers
Note: G = Games pitched; IP = Innings pitched; W = Wins; L = Losses; ERA = Earned run average; SO = Strikeouts

ALDS

Game 1
September 29 at Yankee Stadium (New York Yankees)

Game 2
September 30 at Yankee Stadium (New York Yankees)

Game 3
October 2 at The Ballpark in Arlington (Texas Rangers)

ALCS

New York wins the series, 4-2

World Series

Game 1
October 17, 1998, at Yankee Stadium in New York

Game 2
October 18, 1998, at Yankee Stadium in New York

Game 3
October 20, 1998, at Qualcomm Stadium in San Diego, California

Game 4
October 21, 1998, at Qualcomm Stadium in San Diego, California

Awards and honors
 Scott Brosius, 3B, World Series Most Valuable Player
 David Wells, Pitcher, American League Championship Series Most Valuable Player
 David Cone, Pitcher, Hutch Award
 Derek Jeter, Shortstop, American League Leader in Runs scored, 127
 Joe Torre, Associated Press Manager of the Year
 Bernie Williams, Outfielder, 1998 American League Batting Title
All-Star Game

Farm system

References

1998 New York Yankees at Baseball Reference
1998 World Series
1998 New York Yankees at Baseball Almanac

New York Yankees seasons
New York Yankees
New York Yankees
1990s in the Bronx
American League East champion seasons
American League champion seasons
World Series champion seasons